Przemysław Niemiec (born 11 April 1980) is a Polish former road racing cyclist, who rode professionally between 2002 and 2018 for the ,  and  squads.

Career
He made his professional debut in 2002 for the team . Born in Oświęcim, Niemiec won the 2005 Tour of Slovenia and the 2006 edition of the Tour of Tuscany. He has also won a number of stages of the Route du Sud and finished sixteenth alongside the leading competitors at the 2008 Summer Olympics.

In 2013, Niemiec had top ten finishes in many stage races including the Giro Del Trentino, the Volta a Catalunya, and in the Tirreno Adriactico. After finishing 3rd in the 2013 Giro del Trentino, Niemiec was selected to Team Lampre squad at the Giro d'Italia and he rode in support of Michele Scarponi, where he had a very solid 6th-place finish.

He won the biggest victory of his career at that point at the 2014 Vuelta a España. He was part of an early breakaway and won solo on the final climb to Lagos de Covedonga.

Major results

2003
 1st Giro del Medio Brenta
2004
 1st GP Città di Rio Saliceto e Correggio
 1st  Mountains classification Tour de Pologne
 5th Overall Brixia Tour
 5th Coppa Placci
 6th Gran Premio di Lugano
 8th Overall Settimana Ciclistica Lombarda
 8th Giro del Medio Brenta
 10th Gran Premio Città di Camaiore
2005
 1st  Overall Tour of Slovenia
1st Mountains classification
1st Stage 3
 1st Mountains classification Tour Méditerranéen
 1st Stage 1 Giro del Trentino
 2nd Overall Route du Sud
 3rd Giro dell'Appennino
 10th Milano–Torino
 10th Giro d'Oro
 10th GP Industria & Artigianato di Larciano
2006
 1st Giro di Toscana
 3rd Overall Tour of Slovenia
 4th Overall Route du Sud
1st Stage 3
 5th Giro d'Oro
 6th Overall Brixia Tour
 7th Overall Giro del Trentino
2008
 1st Stage 3 Route du Sud
 6th Overall Tour of Slovenia
 6th Giro del Medio Brenta
 10th Memorial Cimurri
2009
 1st  Overall Route du Sud
1st Stage 2
 3rd Overall Giro del Trentino
1st Stage 2
 5th Overall Giro della Provincia di Grosseto
 8th Overall Settimana Internazionale di Coppi e Bartali
 8th Gran Premio Industria e Commercio di Prato
 9th GP Industria & Artigianato di Larciano
2010
 2nd Overall Settimana Internazionale di Coppi e Bartali
1st  Mountains classification
1st Stage 3
 2nd Overall Tour des Pyrénées
1st Stage 2
 3rd Overall Settimana Ciclistica Lombarda
1st  Mountains classification
 5th Overall Route du Sud
 6th Overall Giro di Sardegna
 6th Subida al Naranco
 10th Gran Premio Industria e Commercio di Prato
2011
 5th Giro dell'Emilia
 5th Giro di Lombardia
 6th Gran Piemonte
2012
 4th Gran Premio Bruno Beghelli
 9th Giro dell'Appennino
 10th Trofeo Melinda
2013
 6th Overall Giro d'Italia
 6th Overall Giro del Trentino
 6th Trofeo Serra de Tramuntana
 7th Overall Volta a Catalunya
 9th Overall Tirreno–Adriatico
2014
 1st Stage 15 Vuelta a España
 3rd Overall Giro del Trentino
 5th Overall Tour de Pologne
2015
 9th Strade Bianche
2016
 Presidential Tour of Turkey
1st  Mountains classification
1st Stage 1 
 2nd Overall Tour of Hainan
2017
 8th Overall Tour of Turkey
  Combativity award Stage 8 Vuelta a España

Grand Tour general classification results timeline

References

External links

Cyclists at the 2008 Summer Olympics
Polish male cyclists
Olympic cyclists of Poland
1980 births
Living people
People from Oświęcim
Sportspeople from Lesser Poland Voivodeship
2014 Vuelta a España stage winners
Polish Vuelta a España stage winners
21st-century Polish people